Takhteh Pol may refer to:
 Takhteh Pol, Afghanistan
 Takhteh Pol, Iran
 Takhteh Pol, Gilan, Iran